James Smith (born 20 January 1947 in Glasgow) is a Scottish former footballer. Smith played for Aberdeen, Washington Whips, Newcastle United and Celtic. He also appeared in four international matches for Scotland, between 1968 and 1974.

Aberdeen

During his career he played initially for Aberdeen where he was popularly known as "Jinky". He won a Scottish Cup runners up medal in 1967, as Aberdeen lost to Celtic in the final. Aberdeen represented Washington Whips in summer 1967 in the United Soccer Association's inaugural season. In the final, which Washington lost 6-5 to Los Angeles Wolves, Smith was sent off after 30 minutes.

His younger brother Joe also played for Aberdeen, winning a Scottish League Cup winners' medal in November 1976 when Aberdeen beat Celtic 2–0 in the final.

Newcastle United

He transferred from Aberdeen to Newcastle United in July 1969 for a fee of £80,000. He became a popular player amongst the club's supporters with his mazy runs and flair.

Smith experienced a series of knee problems and was sent out on loan to Celtic in the hope it would recover him from the injury problems and allow him to regain form. He failed to do this, however, and was forced to retire at the age of 29.

Scotland

He also won four caps for Scotland. The first was when he was with Aberdeen in a 0-0 draw v Netherlands in 1968. He then collected three further caps when at Newcastle in a six-month period between November 1973 and May 1974.

He also played once for the Scottish Football League XI.

References

External links
 
 

1947 births
Footballers from Glasgow
Living people
Association football midfielders
Scottish footballers
Scotland international footballers
Benburb F.C. players
Aberdeen F.C. players
Newcastle United F.C. players
Celtic F.C. players
Scottish Football League players
Scottish Junior Football Association players
English Football League players
Scottish Football League representative players
Scotland under-23 international footballers
Washington Whips players
Scottish expatriate sportspeople in the United States
Expatriate soccer players in the United States
Scottish expatriate footballers
FA Cup Final players